Yeouido Park is a park in Yeouido-dong, Yeongdeungpo District, Seoul, South Korea.

The park, which runs northeast–southwest through the centre of the island, has a large open area which is popular with bicyclists and skateboarders, and breaks into footpaths lined with trees and seasonal flowers.

History
During the Japanese rule of Korea, the site was the location of Seoul's first airport, built in April 1924. In the 1970s, the area was developed into an asphalt strip as part of the Han River development project led by President Park Chung-hee, who named it May 16 Square in reference to the coup he led in 1961.

In May 1984, Pope John Paul II held a canonization mass in the park for Saints Andrew Kim Taegon, Paul Chong Hasang, and 101 other martyrs who were executed under the Joseon Dynasty .

After having lain under asphalt for 27 years, May 16 Square was subsequently redeveloped, and was reopened on July 5, 1999.

Gallery

See also
 Hangang Park

References

External links

 Yeouido Park from Parks and Mountains of Seoul

Parks in Seoul
Yeouido